John Watts (1755–1801) was a Royal Navy officer.
In 1787–1789, while on leave from the navy, he sailed as a passenger on Lady Penrhyn with the First Fleet to New South Wales, and acted as supercargo on the return voyage to England via Canton.

Extracts from Watts's journal of the First Fleet voyage appear in The Voyage of Governor Phillip to Botany Bay, as do three plates after his sketches.

Notes

References

Transcript at Project Gutenberg Australia

1755 births
1801 deaths
Royal Navy officers
James Cook
People from the City of London